Vincgalys (formerly) is a village in Kėdainiai district municipality, in Kaunas County, in central Lithuania. According to the 2011 census, the village has a population of 60 people. It is located 2 km from Šlapaberžė. There is wooden manor house, built at the end of the 18th century in Vincgalys village.

Demography

References

Villages in Kaunas County
Kėdainiai District Municipality